Jia Michelle Cobb (born 1980) is an American attorney serving as a United States district judge of the United States District Court for the District of Columbia. She previously worked as a legal partner at Relman Colfax from 2012 to 2021.

Early life and education 
Cobb was born in Springfield, Ohio. After graduating from Mercy High School in Farmington Hills, Michigan, she earned her Bachelor of Arts from Northwestern University in 2002 and her Juris Doctor from Harvard Law School in 2005.

Career 

Cobb began her career as a law clerk for Judge Diane Wood of the United States Court of Appeals for the Seventh Circuit from 2005 to 2006. Cobb was then a trial attorney for the District of Columbia Public Defender Service from 2006 to 2012. Cobb supervised incoming attorneys and was a member of the Forensic Practice Group. Cobb also taught law at the Washington College of Law and Harvard Law School. She worked as a legal partner at Relman Colfax, a national plaintiff-side civil rights law firm from 2012 to 2021. Cobb previously served as an elected member of the District of Columbia Bar's Criminal Law and Individual Rights Section Steering Committee.

Notable cases 

In 2008, Cobb represented Christopher Timmons. Timmons was charged with bringing a grenade and other weapons near the United States Capitol complex. Timmons claimed that he wanted to assist the police in their functions during his defense.

In 2016, Cobb represented Briggitta Hardin, who was hired to work at the Redline sports bar in Washington, D.C. Chinatown in December 2010 but was fired just before its grand opening. Hardin sued Redline and owner Mick Dadlani, claiming her dismissal was because of the color of her skin.

In 2021, Cobb led the filing of lawsuits against the County of Stafford, the City of Fredericksburg, the District of Columbia, and other governmental organizations. The suit claimed they allegedly infringing upon the First and Fourteenth Amendment rights of Black Lives Matter protesters.

Federal judicial service 

On June 15, 2021, President Joe Biden nominated Cobb to serve as a United States district judge of the United States District Court for the District of Columbia. She has been nominated to the seat vacated by Judge Emmet G. Sullivan, who assumed senior status on April 3, 2021. Cobb was previously recommended for the position by House Delegate Eleanor Holmes Norton. On July 14, 2021, a hearing on her nomination was held before the Senate Judiciary Committee. On August 5, 2021, her nomination was reported out of committee a 13–9 vote. On October 26, 2021, the United States Senate invoked cloture on her nomination by a 51–46 vote. Her nomination was confirmed later that day by a 52–45 vote. She received her judicial commission on November 12, 2021.

See also 
 List of African-American federal judges
 List of African-American jurists

References

External links 

1980 births
Living people
21st-century African-American women
21st-century African-American people
21st-century American judges
21st-century American lawyers
21st-century American women lawyers
21st-century American women judges
African-American judges
African-American lawyers
Harvard Law School alumni
Judges of the United States District Court for the District of Columbia
Michigan lawyers
Northwestern University alumni
People from Springfield, Ohio
Public defenders
United States district court judges appointed by Joe Biden
Washington College of Law faculty